Scleria amazonica is a plant species native to the State of Amazonas in southern Venezuela.

Scleria amazonica is a perennial herb spreading by means of underground rhizomes. Stem is triangular in cross-section, up to 120 cm tall. Leaves are up to 45 cm long, with a V-shaped ligule of dense hairs. Inflorescences unisexual, in a paniculate arrangement, up to 46 cm long. Achenes have a course network of raised decorations on the surface.

References

amazonica
Endemic flora of Venezuela
Plants described in 1997